United States gubernatorial elections were held in 1802, in 12 states, concurrent with the House and Senate elections.

Six governors were elected by popular vote and six were elected by state legislatures.

In Georgia, a special election was held following the resignation of incumbent Governor Josiah Tattnall.

In New Jersey, three tied ballots were taken in October and November, resulting in no choice of Governor. The Vice-President of the Executive Council, John Lambert, served the term as acting Governor.

In North Carolina, the winner of the ordinary election, John B. Ashe, died before taking office. A special election was then held.

Results

See also 
1802 United States elections

References

Notes

Bibliography